Dewas Lok Sabha constituency is one of the 29 Lok Sabha (parliamentary) constituencies in the Indian state of Madhya Pradesh. This constituency came into existence in 2008 as a part of the implementation of delimitation of parliamentary constituencies. Following delimitation, Shajapur constituency ceased to exist and Dewas constituency came into being. This constituency is reserved for the candidates belonging to the Scheduled castes and covers parts of Sehore, Shajapur, Agar Malwa and Dewas districts.

Since May 2019, the Member of Parliament for this constituency is Mahendra Solanki whose term is expected to last until May 2024.

Assembly segments
Presently, Dewas Lok Sabha constituency comprises the following eight Vidhan Sabha (legislative assembly) segments:

Agar, Shajapur, Shujalpur, Dewas, Sonkatch and Hatpipliya Vidhan Sabha segments were earlier part of the erstwhile Shajapur (Lok Sabha constituency), while Ashta segment was earlier part of Bhopal (Lok Sabha constituency).

Members of Parliament

Election results

2019

2014

2009

1962

See also
 Shajapur (Lok Sabha constituency)
 Dewas district
 List of Constituencies of the Lok Sabha

References

Lok Sabha constituencies in Madhya Pradesh
Dewas district
1962 establishments in Madhya Pradesh
2009 establishments in Madhya Pradesh
1967 disestablishments in India
Constituencies established in 1962
Constituencies established in 2009